Kabou is a village in the Bassar Prefecture in the Kara Region  of north-western Togo.  Due to its central location, it is used as a marketplace where people travel in from Ghana, Bassar, Kara, and Guérin-Kouka to sell goods.  Formally Kabou was known for iron exporting out of a mine in Banjeli, which is about 20 km outside Kabou, until it was later privatized.

History
The city was founded by Oukpan, also known as Le Guerrier, The Hunter.  The local language is Bassar.

References

External links
Satellite map at Maplandia.com

Populated places in Kara Region
Bassar Prefecture